The 1991 Princeton Tigers football team was an American football team that represented Princeton University during the 1991 NCAA Division I-AA football season. Princeton finished second in the Ivy League.

In their fifth year under head coach Steve Tosches, the Tigers compiled an 8–2 record and outscored opponents 253 to 171. Jim Freeman was the team captain.

Princeton's 5–2 conference record placed second in the Ivy League standings. The Tigers outscored Ivy opponents 172 to 126. 

Princeton played its home games at Palmer Stadium on the university campus in Princeton, New Jersey.

Schedule

References

Princeton
Princeton Tigers football seasons
Princeton Tigers football